The Maryborough Castlemaine District Football Netball League is an Australian rules football league based in central Victoria. This is a minor league with clubs coming from towns near the regional centres of Maryborough,  and Castlemaine.

History
The Maryborough District Football League was formed prior to 1914.  It absorbed a number of clubs from the Castlemaine District Football League, when that competition ceased in 1952. Other clubs from the Castlemaine District Football League moved to the Bendigo District Football Association.

The name was changed to Maryborough Castlemaine District Football League in 1982.

In 2011 the league admitted 4 clubs from the Lexton Plains Football League that had gone into recess.

The highest ever score in a senior game of Australian rules football was scored in this league in 1990, when Campbells Creek defeated Primrose 100.34 (634) to 3.0 (18).

On 27 June 2015, Navarre defeated Royal Park to set a new record for most consecutive wins (31) in the Maryborough Castlemaine District Football League. Navarre's last loss was in the 2013 2nd Qualifying Final where Newstead won by 24 points.

Clubs

Current clubs

Former Clubs 
Bealiba
Bristol Hill
Chewton
Primrose
Timor

Recent Premierships

1932 Dunolly
1933 Dunolly
1934 Primrose
1935 Royal Park
1936 Institute
1937 Primrose
1938 Royal Park
1939 Newstead
1940 Patience & Nicholson
1941 competition in recess
1942 competition in recess
1943 competition in recess
1944 competition in recess
1945 Patience & Nicholson
1946 Maryborough
1947 Patience & Nicholson
1948 Patience & Nicholson
1949  Carisbrook
1950  Carisbrook
1951  Primrose
1952  Maldon
1953  Campbells Creek
1954  Carisbrook

1955  Maldon
1956  Maldon
1957  Maldon
1958  Dunolly
1959  Dunolly
1960  Carisbrook
1961  Dunolly
1962  Dunolly
1963  Dunolly
1964  Carisbrook
1965  Talbot
1966  Newstead
1967  Royal Park
1968  Royal Park
1969  Dunolly
1970  Carisbrook
1971  Harcourt
1972  Royal Park
1973  Royal Park
1974  Royal Park
1975  Chewton
1976  Carisbrook
1977  Royal Park

1978  Maryborough Rovers
1979  Newstead
1980  Carisbrook
1981  Royal Park
1982  Royal Park
1983  Maldon
1984  Primrose
1985  Maldon
1986  Chewton
1987  Maldon
1988  Maldon
1989  Talbot
1990  Maryborough Rovers
1991  Maryborough Rovers
1992  Trentham
1993  Newstead
1994  Trentham
1995  Talbot
1996  Talbot
1997   Talbot  
1998   Talbot  
1999   Carisbrook  
2000   Newstead  
  
2001   Talbot 
2002   Harcourt   
2003   Harcourt 
2004   Carisbrook  
2005   Carisbrook 
2006   Harcourt
2007   Harcourt 
2008   Carisbrook
2009   Newstead
2010   Maldon
2011   Natte-Bealiba
2012   Carisbrook
2013   Navarre
2014   Navarre
2015   Navarre
2016   Navarre
2017   Carisbrook
2018   Carisbrook
2019   Natte-Bealiba
2020 League in recess due to COVID19 pandemic 
2022   Harcourt

2007 Ladder
																	

FINALS

2008 Ladder
																	

FINALS

2009 Ladder
																	

FINALS

2010 Ladder 
																		
																		
FINALS

2011 Ladder 
																	
																	
FINALS

2012 Ladder 
																	
																	
FINALS

2013 Ladder 
																	
																	
FINALS																	
 																	

Match Report

" Navarre are the 2013 Bendigo Bank Maryborough Castlemaine District Football Netball League Premiers after dominating Lexton to win by a massive 100 points in front of the second biggest Grand Final crowd ever at Princes Park on Sunday.

The Grasshoppers were not to be denied in their third successive Grand Final and their desperation from the opening bounce was evident as they led the Tigers to the ball at every opportunity, and used the ball with precision to allow free flowing scoring for the Navarre forwards while Lexton struggled to have any forward entries at all.

Ash Driscoll scored three goals in the opening term while Daniel Parkin was allowed to get loose on many occasions and made the most of his freedom. Parkin returned for the Grand Final from a broken jaw and was wearing protective headgear, but it had no ill effects on the Grasshoppers coach as he continually racked up possessions.  Navarre led at the first change by 31 points. 5.2.(32) to 0.1.(1)

The first term was the template for the remainder of the game. Lexton tried hard but they had little influence on the scoreboard  Star forward Matt Brown finally broke through for a goal at the nine-minute mark of the second term, but had to shoot from tight on the boundary as the Navarre defence led by Brent Flood and Bryce Tickner was holding up to any attacking moves by the Tigers.

Ben Scott had a remarkable final series and once again had a day out and was the recipient of the AFL Victoria Country medal for Best player on the ground. Scott kicked two of his five goals in the second term and led the way for the Navarre running brigade as did Josh Driscoll who was judged to be Navarre’s best player by the Grasshoppers hierarchy. Aiden Lee was also under notice and received the MCDFNL medal for his performance.

With the game being well and truly over at half time, Lexton still tried valiantly but could not make inroads on the scoreboard, as the Grasshoppers finished strongly in the final term with an avalanche of scoring shots which produced goals to numerous players including three to Sam Robertson who took some strong contested pack marks and kicked truly for the Grasshoppers to snare the 2013 Premiership, winning 19.12.126 to Lexton's 4.2.26

Lexton’s better players were Jimmy Templeton, Mick Jennings and Lewis Alexopolous, but it was a day the Tigers would rather forget with four teams (senior football and A, B & C Grade netball) in on the day and all suffered losses.

It was a memorable day for Navarre as their A Grade netball team, much like the Senior footballers, finally broke through for their first ever MCDFNL premiership on their third attempt, vanquishing the demons from twelve months prior after besting 2012 conqueror Lexton by 13 goals, winning 54-41 with Lauren Armstrong awarded the best on court medal. "

2014 Ladder 
																	
																	
FINALS																	
 																	

Match Report

" NAVARRE overcame a slow start in Sunday’s Maryborough-Castlemaine District Football League grand final before powering away from Carisbrook to win by 55 points at Princes Park.

The 16.21 (117) to 9.8 (62) victory capped a magnificent double for the MCDFL’s latest power side - not only back-to-back flags, but an undefeated 2014 season. “This is probably sweeter than last year” Navarre coach Daniel Parkin said. “Back-to-back is hard to do, but to have also done it undefeated this year is unbelievable.”

While the final result was a 55-point win to Navarre, there were anxious moments early for the Grasshoppers. The Grasshoppers kicked the opening goal of the game through Cody Driscoll, but that would be their only major of the first term.

Through the Grasshoppers’ previous 18 games this year, no side had led them by more than 10 points at any of the quarter breaks. But by quarter-time they were 20 points down after the Redbacks had the better of the first term. The Redbacks had nine scoring shots to four to lead 4.5 to 1.3 at quarter-time. Jackson Bowen, Liam Cunningham, Matthew Bilton and Cole Roscholler all kicked first-term goals for the Redbacks. But the 20-point quarter-time lead should have been more after the Redbacks squandered several gettable set-shots.

However, the Grasshoppers were quick to respond to the challenge in the second term. With the midfield led by Josh Driscoll, Ben Scott, Sam Kaye and captain Louis Hannett getting on top, the Grasshoppers surged back.
Navarre kicked 5.3 to 1.1 in the second term, with a goal to Kris Brennan with the last kick of the quarter giving the Grasshoppers a six-point lead at half-time, 6.6 to 5.6.

And that momentum the Grasshoppers built in the second term continued into the third quarter as they blew the game open. The Grasshoppers’ domination of possession in the third term was highlighted in the 15-4 inside 50 count in their favour, while they kicked 5.8 to 1.1. To that stage since quarter-time, the Grasshoppers had kicked 10.11 to 2.2, had 30 inside 50s to 13 and 10 centre breaks to three. Leading by 37 points at three quarter-time, the Grasshoppers finished off with five goals to three in the final term.

All three of Carisbrook’s last-quarter goals were kicked by Cunningham, who earned the MCDFL best on ground medal for his effort in kicking six of the Redbacks’  nine goals for the match. His sixth goal was a sensational kick under pressure from the boundary in the scoreboard pocket.

The AFL Victoria Country Medal was won by Navarre’s Scott, who was also a best-on-ground medallist  in last year’s 101-point grand final win over Lexton.

Others in the best were Daniel Reading, forward Kris Brennan (four goals), Hannett, the dashing Bryce Tickner and Josh Driscoll. As well as Brennan, full-forward Ashley Driscoll also kicked four goals to take his season tally to 84.

Carisbrook’s best were ruckman Bowen, Cunningham - who finished the year with 82 goals - defenders Andrew Lovett and Nathan O’Keefe, along with Jakob Tidyman and wingman Hayden Barby.
“We started well and controlled the footy early, but to Navarre’s credit, they were just too good for us,” outgoing Carisbrook coach Luke Treacy said.

As well as the seniors, Navarre also won the A-grade netball for the second year in a row, too.  "

2015 Ladder 
																	
																	
FINALS																	
 																	

Match Report

" Navarre has won their third successive premiership in the Bendigo Bank Maryborough Castlemaine District Football Netball League after a convincing 51 point victory over Carisbrook in the 2015 MCDFNL Grand Final

It was an opening term blitz that set up the victory as Navarre dominated at the centre bounce and took a stranglehold on possession denying the Redbacks the ball and restricting their scoring opportunities as the Grasshopper defence only allowed three entries into the forward fifty in the opening term.  Mitch Whelan was the Redbacks only goal scorer when he marked a pass from Joel Riske, but this was to be their only score for the term.  With Navarre having so much off the ball, the Carisbrook defence was under extreme pressure as the Grasshoppers shared the ball around amongst six different goal scorers for the quarter to take a 33 point lead into quarter time.

Carisbrook overcame their first quarter jitters and started to gain a lot more possession of the ball and had five shots on goal in succession, but inaccuracy was costly as they could only score two goals through Brady Neil and Nathan Wright.  But any inroads they made into reducing the margin was nullified late in the quarter, when Jesse Hannett produced an outstanding piece of play when he bounced out of a pack of Redbacks and snapped a miraculous snap from the boundary on his left foot, and this was quickly followed by a goal to the MCDFNL Grand Final Medallist in Cody Driscoll who also threaded a goal from the same spot that Hannett had goaled from.

Driscoll goaled again on the siren as the Grasshoppers led by 45 points at half time.

Carisbrook was inspired by an incredible checkside goal from Mitch Whelan half way through the third term and this was followed by three more goals for the Redbacks through Nathan and Nick Wright and Brady Neil as they mounted as comeback and were able to win the term and reduced the margin to just 30 points going into the final term and with the momentum swinging their way, would have been confident of finishing the game strongly.

However, a left foot snap from Cody Driscoll from the first forward entry of the final quarter put to rest any chance of a Carisbrook revival, and then the high flying forward made sure of the victory when he took a very strong pack mark and kicked the sealer just a minute later.  From this point in the game, Navarre coasted to victory knowing that they had the premiership cup in its keeping and the fifty one point victory gave the Grasshoppers their third premiership in succession and 41st consecutive senior victory.

It was an all-round performance from Navarre with every player contributing, but it was Daniel Parkin and Louis Hannett’s attack on the ball that was a key for the Grasshoppers victory, while being supported by the three Driscoll Brothers, with Cody kicking five goals and Ash booting four goals, and Josh providing a lot of drive on the wing on his way to winning the AFL Victoria Country Medal.

With the ball being in Navarre’s forward line for the majority of the game, Carisbrook defenders Kurt Bruechert and Adam Hurse were key players for the Redbacks, and were supported by Brady Neil, Jakob Tidyman and Mitch Whelan. "

2016 Ladder 

In round 9 (26 June 2016), Navarre defeated Natte-Bealiba for its 50th consecutive victory.,

FINALS

2017 Ladder 

FINALS

Books
History of Football in the Bendigo District - John Stoward -

References

External links
League's Official Website

Australian rules football competitions in Victoria (Australia)
Netball leagues in Victoria (Australia)
Sports leagues established in 1907
1907 establishments in Australia